The 1963 German football championship was the culmination of the football season in the Federal Republic of Germany in 1962–63. Borussia Dortmund were crowned champions for the third time after a group stage and a final, having previously won the championship in 1956 and 1957.

On the strength of this title, the club participated in the 1963–64 European Cup, where Borussia lost to F.C. Internazionale Milano in the semi-finals.

Runners-up 1. FC Köln made its third appearance in the national title game, having won the previous years championship and lost in 1960.

The format used to determine the German champion was similar to the one used in the 1962 season. Nine clubs qualified for the tournament, with the runners-up of South and North having to play a qualifying match. The remaining eight clubs then played a home-and-away round in two groups of four, with the two group winners entering the final. In the previous year, a single round had been played in the group stages because of the 1962 FIFA World Cup, where Germany participated in, to reduce the schedule.

The 1963 edition marked the last year, where the German championship was decided in a final. From 1963 onwards, the championship would go to the new Bundesliga champion.

Qualified teams
The following teams qualified through the 1962–63 Oberliga season:

Competition

Qualifying round

Group 1

Group 2

Final

References

Sources
 kicker Allmanach 1990, by kicker, p. 165,177 - German championship 1963

External links
 German Championship 1962-63 at Weltfussball.de
 Germany - Championship 1962-63 at RSSSF.com
 German championship 1963 at Fussballdaten.de

1963
1